The 2014 NPF Draft is the eleventh annual NPF Draft.  It was held March 31, 2014 8:00 PM ET in Nashville, TN at the Ford Theatre at the Country Music Hall of Fame and Museum.  The first selection was Arizona State's Dallas Escobedo, picked by the Pennsylvania Rebellion.

The Draft

Position key: 
C = catcher; INF = infielder; SS = shortstop; OF = outfielder; UT = Utility infielder; P = pitcher; RHP = right-handed pitcher; LHP = left-handed pitcher
Positions will be listed as combined for those who can play multiple positions.

Round 1

Round 2

Round 3

Round 4

Round 5

Draft notes

References

2014 in softball
National Pro Fastpitch drafts
Softball in the United States
Softball teams